Miringoni is a town located on the west coast of the island of Mohéli in the Comoros Islands. It is mostly formed by the people from the Island of Grand Comore. According to some historians of the Island, this town and some other three towns in Island where were formed as a gift from the sultan of Moheli that time to what the so-called "MASSUDJAYI MAWATWANI". They were the great fighters from the Island of Grand Comore who frighted against the invaders from the other Island of Anjouan who used to invade the Island in the harvest time and take their crops by force. The MASSUDJAYI MAWATWANI succeeded to take invaders out of the Island, the sultan of Moheli decided as a reward to give some places in the Island so that they can form their villages and live with their families. These villages are Miringoni, Boingoma, Itsamia, and other.     

Populated places in Mohéli